The Indianapolis Tennis Championships was an annual men's tennis tournament played in Indianapolis as part of the ATP Tour.  Since its inaugural playing in 1987, the tournament was held for one week in July up until its final playing in 2009.  Originally known as the U.S. Men's Claycourt Championships, the event was created after the Indianapolis Sports Center decided to resurface its 18 clay courts with Deco-Turf II, the same surface as the US Open. As a consequence, the U.S. Men's Clay Court Championships was moved from Indianapolis to Charleston, South Carolina. From 1992–2006 it was known as the RCA Championships.

The tournament's change in surface and name came with a change of date to be closer to the start of the US Open. The event gained the attention of the world's best players and became a premier warm-up stop for the US Open.

The tournament ended in 2009 and a new tournament in Atlanta replaced it in 2010.

Past finals

Singles

Doubles

References

Defunct tennis tournaments in the United States
Hard court tennis tournaments in the United States
ATP Tour
Tennis Championships

cs:Indianapolis Tennis Championships
es:Torneo de Indianápolis
fr:Tournoi d'Indianapolis
hi:इंडियानापोलिस टेनिस प्रतियोगिता
it:Indianapolis Tennis Championships
pl:Indianapolis Tennis Championships
sv:Indianapolis Tennis Championships